Gerard Ravello (born 5 March 1959) is a French curler.

Teams

References

External links

Living people
1959 births
French male curlers

Place of birth missing (living people)